Gene Derwood (1909–1954) was an American poet, painter and wife of the poet and anthologist Oscar Williams.

Life 
The couple lived in a penthouse of an office building at 35 Water Street, Lower Manhattan.

The Lilly Library of Indiana University holds a collection of her letters. Harvard University also holds archival material.

Works 
"After reading St. John the Divine", Nox Oculi
"Elegy on Gordon Barber" (poem), L'Ecritoire, August 27, 2005
 The Poems of Gene Derwood, Clarke and Way, 1955.

References

1909 births
1954 deaths
American women poets
20th-century American poets
20th-century American women writers